Sarason is a surname. Notable people with the surname include:

Donald Sarason (1933–2017), American mathematician
Leonard Sarason (1925–1994), American composer
Seymour Sarason (1919–2010), American psychologist

See also
Sarason interpolation theorem, is a generalization of the Caratheodory interpolation theorem and Nevanlinna–Pick